The Pulitzer Prize for Poetry is one of the seven American Pulitzer Prizes awarded annually for Letters, Drama, and Music. It was first presented in 1922, and is given for a distinguished volume of original verse by an American author, published during the preceding calendar year.

Finalists have been announced since 1980, ordinarily two others beside the winner.

1918 and 1919 special prizes

Before the establishment of the award, the 1918 and 1919 Pulitzer cycles included three Pulitzer Prize Special Citations and Awards (called at the time the Columbia University Poetry Prize) for poetry books funded by "a special grant from The Poetry Society." See Special Pulitzers for Letters.
 1918: Love Songs by Sara Teasdale
 1919: Cornhuskers by Carl Sandburg
 1919: The Old Road to Paradise by Margaret Widdemer

Winners

In its first 92 years to 2013, the Pulitzer Prize for Poetry was awarded 92 times. Two were given in 2008, none in 1946. Robert Frost won the prize four times and several others won it more than once (below).

1920s
 1922: Collected Poems by Edwin Arlington Robinson
 1923: "The Ballad of the Harp-Weaver", A Few Figs from Thistles, and "Eight Sonnets", by Edna St. Vincent Millay
 1924: New Hampshire: A Poem with Notes and Grace Notes by Robert Frost
 1925: The Man Who Died Twice by Edwin Arlington Robinson
 1926: What's O'Clock by Amy Lowell
 1927: Fiddler's Farewell by Leonora Speyer
 1928: Tristram by Edwin Arlington Robinson
 1929: John Brown's Body by Stephen Vincent Benét

1930s
 1930: Selected Poems by Conrad Aiken
 1931: Collected Poems by Robert Frost
 1932: The Flowering Stone by George Dillon
 1933: Conquistador by Archibald MacLeish
 1934: Collected Verse by Robert Hillyer
 1935: Bright Ambush by Audrey Wurdemann
 1936: Strange Holiness by Robert P. T. Coffin
 1937: A Further Range by Robert Frost
 1938: Cold Morning Sky by Marya Zaturenska
 1939: Selected Poems by John Gould Fletcher

1940s
 1940: Collected Poems by Mark Van Doren
 1941: Sunderland Capture by Leonard Bacon
 1942: The Dust Which Is God by William Rose Benét
 1943: A Witness Tree by Robert Frost
 1944: Western Star by Stephen Vincent Benét
 1945: V-Letter and Other Poems by Karl Shapiro
 1946: no award given
 1947: Lord Weary's Castle by Robert Lowell
 1948: The Age of Anxiety by W. H. Auden
 1949: Terror and Decorum by Peter Viereck

1950s

 1950: Annie Allen by Gwendolyn Brooks
 1951: Complete Poems by Carl Sandburg
 1952: Collected Poems by Marianne Moore
 1953: Collected Poems 1917-1952 by Archibald MacLeish
 1954: The Waking by Theodore Roethke
 1955: Collected Poems by Wallace Stevens
 1956: Poems: North & South — A Cold Spring by Elizabeth Bishop
 1957: Things of This World by Richard Wilbur
 1958: Promises: Poems 1954-1956 by Robert Penn Warren
 1959: Selected Poems 1928-1958 by Stanley Kunitz

1960s
 1960: Heart's Needle by W. D. Snodgrass
 1961: Times Three: Selected Verse From Three Decades by Phyllis McGinley
 1962: Poems by Alan Dugan
 1963: Pictures from Brueghel by William Carlos Williams
 1964: At The End Of The Open Road by Louis Simpson
 1965: 77 Dream Songs by John Berryman
 1966: Selected Poems by Richard Eberhart
 1967: Live or Die by Anne Sexton
 1968: The Hard Hours by Anthony Hecht
 1969: Of Being Numerous by George Oppen

1970s
 1970: Untitled Subjects by Richard Howard
 1971: The Carrier of Ladders by W. S. Merwin
 1972: Collected Poems by James Wright
 1973: Up Country by Maxine Kumin
 1974: The Dolphin by Robert Lowell
 1975: Turtle Island by Gary Snyder
 1976: Self-portrait in a Convex Mirror by John Ashbery
 1977: Divine Comedies by James Merrill
 1978: Collected Poems by Howard Nemerov
 1979: Now and Then by Robert Penn Warren

1980s
Indented entries are finalists after each year's winner.
 1980: Selected Poems by Donald Justice
 Goshawk, Antelope by Dave Smith 
 Selected Poems by Richard Hugo 
 1981: The Morning of the Poem by James Schuyler
 Selected Poems by Mark Strand 
 The Right Madness on Skye by Richard Hugo 
 1982: The Collected Poems by Sylvia Plath
 Dream Flights by Dave Smith 
 The Southern Cross by Charles Wright
 1983: Selected Poems by Galway Kinnell
 Country Music, Selected Early Poems by Charles Wright
 Monolithos, Poems 1962 and 1982 by Jack Gilbert 
 1984: American Primitive by Mary Oliver
 Collected Poems, 1930-1982 by Josephine Miles 
 Weather-Fear: New and Selected Poems by John Engels
 1985: Yin by Carolyn Kizer
 Ground Work by Robert Duncan
 The Other Side of the River by Charles Wright
 1986: The Flying Change by Henry S. Taylor
 Saints and Strangers by Andrew Hudgins
 Selected Poems, 1963-1983 by Charles Simic
 1987: Thomas and Beulah by Rita Dove
 The Selected Poetry of Hayden Carruth by Hayden Carruth
 Unending Blues by Charles Simic
 1988: Partial Accounts: New and Selected Poems by William Meredith
 Flesh and Blood by C.K. Williams
 Good Woman: Poems and a Memoir 1969-1980 and Next: New Poems by Lucille Clifton
 1989: New and Collected Poems by Richard Wilbur
 The One Day by Donald Hall
 The River of Heaven by Garrett Hongo

1990s
Indented entries are finalists after each year's winner.

 1990: The World Doesn't End by Charles Simic
 Selected and Last Poems by Paul Zweig
 Time's Power by Adrienne Rich
 
 1991: Near Changes by Mona Van Duyn
 Leaving Another Kingdom by Gerald Stern
 The Transparent Man by Anthony Hecht
 1992: Selected Poems by James Tate
 An Atlas of the Difficult World by Adrienne Rich
 Selected Poems by Robert Creeley
 1993: The Wild Iris by Louise Glück
 Hotel Lautreamont by John Ashbery
 Selected Poems 1946-1985 by James Merrill
 1994: Neon Vernacular: New and Selected Poems by Yusef Komunyakaa
 Bright Existence by Brenda Hillman
 The Metamorphoses of Ovid by Allen Mandelbaum
 1995: The Simple Truth by Philip Levine
 Cosmopolitan Greetings: Poems 1986-1992 by Allen Ginsberg
 On The Great Atlantic Rainway: Selected Poems 1950-1988 and One Train by Kenneth Koch
 1996: The Dream of the Unified Field by Jorie Graham
 Chickamauga by Charles Wright
 New and Selected Poems by Donald Justice
 1997: Alive Together: New and Selected Poems by Lisel Mueller
 The Figured Wheel by Robert Pinsky
 The Willow Grove by Laurie Sheck
 1998: Black Zodiac by Charles Wright
 Desire by Frank Bidart
 The Vigil by C.K. Williams
 1999: Blizzard of One by Mark Strand
 Going Fast by Frederick Seidel
 Mysteries of Small Houses by Alice Notley

2000s
Indented entries are finalists after each year's winner. Two prizes were awarded in 2008.

 2000: Repair by C. K. Williams
 Elegy for the Southern Drawl by Rodney Jones
 Midnight Salvage: Poems 1995-1998 by Adrienne Rich
 2001: Different Hours by Stephen Dunn
 Pursuit of a Wound by Sydney Lea
 The Other Lover by Bruce Smith
 2002: Practical Gods by Carl Dennis
 The Beforelife by Franz Wright
 The Seven Ages by Louise Glück
 2003: Moy Sand and Gravel by Paul Muldoon
 Hazmat by J. D. McClatchy
 Music Like Dirt by Frank Bidart
 2004: Walking to Martha's Vineyard by Franz Wright
 Eyeshot by Heather McHugh
 Middle Earth by Henri Cole
 2005: Delights & Shadows by Ted Kooser
 Search Party: Collected Poems by William Matthews
 The Orchard by Brigit Pegeen Kelly
 2006: Late Wife by Claudia Emerson
 American Sublime by Elizabeth Alexander
 Elegy on Toy Piano by Dean Young
 2007: Native Guard by Natasha Trethewey
 Interrogation Palace: New & Selected Poems 1982-2004 by David Wojahn
 The Republic of Poetry by Martín Espada
 2008: Time and Materials by Robert Hass and Failure by Philip Schultz
 Messenger: New and Selected Poems, 1976-2006 by Ellen Bryant Voigt
 2009: The Shadow of Sirius by W. S. Merwin
 Watching the Spring Festival by Frank Bidart
 What Love Comes To: New & Selected Poems by Ruth Stone

2010s
Indented entries are finalists after each year's winner. 

 2010: Versed by Rae Armantrout
 Inseminating the Elephant by Lucia Perillo
 Tryst by Angie Estes
 2011: The Best of It: New and Selected Poems by Kay Ryan
 Break the Glass by Jean Valentine
 The Common Man by Maurice Manning
 2012: Life on Mars by Tracy K. Smith
 Core Samples from the World by Forrest Gander
 How Long by Ron Padgett
 2013: Stag's Leap by Sharon Olds
 Collected Poems by Jack Gilbert
 The Abundance of Nothing by Bruce Weigl
 2014: 3 Sections by Vijay Seshadri
 The Big Smoke by Adrian Matejka
 The Sleep of Reason by Morri Creech
 2015: Digest by Gregory Pardlo
 Compass Rose by Arthur Sze
 Reel to Reel by Alan Shapiro
 2016: Ozone Journal by Peter Balakian
 Alive: New and Selected Poems by Elizabeth Willis
 Four-Legged Girl by Diane Seuss
 2017: Olio by Tyehimba Jess
 Collected Poems: 1950-2012 by Adrienne Rich
 XX by Campbell McGrath
 2018: Half-light: Collected Poems 1965–2016 by Frank Bidart
 Incendiary Art, by Patricia Smith
 semiautomatic, by Evie Shockley
 2019: Be With by Forrest Gander
 feeld by Jos Charles
 Like by A.E. Stallings

2020s
Indented entries are finalists after each year's winner. 

 2020: The Tradition by Jericho Brown
 Dunce by Mary Ruefle
 Only as the Day Is Long: New and Selected Poems by Dorianne Laux
 2021: Postcolonial Love Poem by Natalie Diaz
 A Treatise on Stars by Mei-mei Berssenbrugge
 In the Lateness of the World by Carolyn Forché
 2022: frank: sonnets by Diane Seuss
 Refractive Africa: Ballet of the Forgotten by Will Alexander 
 Yellow Rain by Mai Der Vang

Repeat winners

Robert Frost won the Pulitzer Prize for Poetry four times from 1924 to 1943. Edwin Arlington Robinson won three prizes during the 1920s and several people, all male, have won two.
 Edwin Arlington Robinson, 1922, 1925, 1928
 Robert Frost, 1924, 1931, 1937, 1943
 Stephen Vincent Benét, 1929, 1944
 Archibald MacLeish, 1933, 1953
 Robert Lowell, 1947, 1974
 Richard Wilbur, 1957, 1989
 Robert Penn Warren, 1958, 1979
 William S. Merwin, 1971, 2009

Carl Sandburg won one of the special prizes for his poetry in 1919 and won the Poetry Pulitzer in 1951.

See also

 American poetry
 List of poetry awards

References

External links
 

Poetry
American poetry awards
Awards established in 1922